NGE can mean:
 Nagoya Grampus Eight, a football club playing for J-League
 National Greek Examination, an examination for the ancient Greek language
 Nation of Gods and Earths or 5 % Nation, a non religious movement that views Islam as a culture and a way of life
 Natural genetic engineering
 NGE, an abbreviation for the N-Gage portable game console by Nokia
 , a Belarusian alternative rock group
 Neon Genesis Evangelion, a number of works in anime/manga franchise of the same name
 New Game Enhancements, a set of changes to the computer game Star Wars Galaxies
 New Georgia Encyclopedia, a web-based encyclopedia about the US state of Georgia